Michelle Pierre (born 1973), is a female former international athlete who competed for England.

Athletics career
She represented England and won a silver medal in the 4 x 400 metres relay event, at the 1998 Commonwealth Games in Kuala Lumpur, Malaysia. The other team members consisted of Donna Fraser, Victoria Day and Michelle Thomas.

She also represented Great Britain at the 1997 World Athletics Championships in Athens, Greece reaching the  final in the 4 x 400 metres relay event and placing 6th.
The other team members consisted of Alison Curbishley, Donna Fraser and Michelle Thomas.

References

1973 births
Living people
English female sprinters
Commonwealth Games medallists in athletics
Commonwealth Games silver medallists for England
Athletes (track and field) at the 1998 Commonwealth Games
Universiade medalists in athletics (track and field)
Universiade bronze medalists for Great Britain
Medallists at the 1998 Commonwealth Games